Nicholas Tabarrok is a film producer who started his producing career with smaller unusual films, made in his native Canada.  Later, larger budget films were made in America, or funded by Americans.

The Hollywood Reporter noted that Tabarrok was skilled at finding funding from government sources, citing his 2018 film Stockholm, as an example.  Stockholm received funding help from Sweden due to casting Noomi Rapace, and other Swedish actors, and received funding help from Canada, where it was filmed.  It reported that American actor Ethan Hawke was the only actor to film any scenes in Sweden—all establishing exterior shots.

Filmography

References

Living people
Year of birth missing (living people)
Canadian film producers